Epacris reclinata, commonly known as fuchsia heath, is a species of flowering plant in the family Ericaceae and is endemic to eastern New South Wales. It is a low-lying to spreading shrub with egg-shaped leaves and pink to red, tube-shaped flowers, sometimes with lighter tips.

Description
The anthers are enclosed within the petal tube.

Taxonomy and naming
Epacris reclinata was first formally described in 1868 by George Bentham from an unpublished description by Allan Cunningham and the description was published in Flora Australiensis. The specific epithet (reclinata) means "leaning back".

Distribution and habitat
Fuchsia heath grows in woodland and heath on damp sandstone cliff faces and rock ledges in the Blue Mountains, and Southern Highlands of eastern New South Wales.

References

reclinata
Ericales of Australia
Flora of New South Wales
Taxa named by George Bentham
Plants described in 1868